The following is a list of lakes and reservoirs in Shenzhen, China.

Luohu District

Futian District

Nanshan District

Yantian District

Bao'an District

Longgang District

See also
List of parks in Shenzhen

References

Reservoirs in Shenzhen
Lakes of Shenzhen
Shenzhen-related lists